Siniša Linić (born 23 August 1982) is a Croatian retired football midfielder who last played for Grobničan.

Club career
After joining NK Rijeka in 1999, he played for two seasons, but limited playing time saw him moving to NK Orijent in 2001. He rejoined NK Rijeka in 2002 for five more seasons before moving to Hajduk Split in 2007. In his first season at Hajduk Split he played 25 games and scored 3 goals. In his second season at the club he played 15 games and scored once. In June 2009 he was released along with three other Hajduk Split players and soon signed for the Israeli side Bnei Yehuda in July 2009. In August 2010 he went to NK Istra 1961 on a free transfer. Although the press linked him in June 2011 with his first club NK Rijeka, Linić signed with the Slovenian club FC Luka Koper.

International career
Linić has made one appearance for the Croatian national team. This came against Hong Kong at the Carlsberg Cup exhibition tournament on 1 February 2006.

Career statistics

Club

International appearances

Honours
Rijeka
Croatian Cup: 2005, 2006

Grobničan
4. HNL - Zapad: 2017–18

References

External links

1982 births
Living people
Footballers from Rijeka
Association football midfielders
Croatian footballers
Croatia international footballers
Croatia under-21 international footballers
HNK Rijeka players
HNK Orijent players
HNK Hajduk Split players
Bnei Yehuda Tel Aviv F.C. players
NK Istra 1961 players
FC Koper players
NK Grobničan players
First Football League (Croatia) players
Croatian Football League players
Israeli Premier League players
Slovenian PrvaLiga players
Croatian expatriate footballers
Expatriate footballers in Israel
Croatian expatriate sportspeople in Israel
Expatriate footballers in Slovenia
Croatian expatriate sportspeople in Slovenia